Erie County is a county located in the northern portion of the U.S. state of Ohio. As of the 2020 census, the population was 75,622. Its county seat and largest city is Sandusky. The county is named for the Erie tribe, whose name was their word for "wildcat". It was formed in 1838 from the northern third of Huron County and a portion of Sandusky County.

Erie County comprises the Sandusky, OH Micropolitan Statistical Area, which is also included in the Cleveland-Akron-Canton, OH Combined Statistical Area.

History
Erie County was created in 1838 from a portion of Huron County. A few subsequent changes to Erie County's boundaries occurred shortly after its initial formation.

Geography
It is the second-smallest county in Ohio by land area after Lake County . The county is bordered on the north by Lake Erie; the opposite shore is made up of two counties in Ontario, Canada.

It is drained by the Huron and Vermilion rivers. Near the Huron River are several ancient earthwork mounds and enclosures constructed by early indigenous peoples. Sandusky has extensive quarries of valuable limestone. The surface is generally level, and the soil alluvial and exceedingly fertile.

Adjacent counties and municipalities
 Essex County, Ontario (north, across Lake Erie)
 Chatham-Kent municipality, Ontario (north, across Lake Erie)
 Lorain County (east)
 Huron County (south)
 Sandusky County (west)
 Ottawa County (northwest)

Major highways

  (Ohio Turnpike)
  (Ohio Turnpike)

Demographics

2000 census
As of the census of 2000, there were 79,551 people, 31,727 households, and 21,764 families residing in the county. The population density was 312 people per square mile (121/km2). There were 35,909 housing units at an average density of 141 per square mile (54/km2). The racial makeup of the county was 88.64% White, 8.64% Black or African American, 0.21% Native American, 0.37% Asian, 0.01% Pacific Islander, 0.53% from other races, and 1.60% from two or more races. 2.09% of the population were Hispanic or Latino of any race. 35.7% were of German, 9.2% Irish, 8.2% English, 8.1% Italian, and 7.8% American ancestry according to Census 2000.

There were 31,727 households, out of which 30.40% had children under the age of 18 living with them, 53.70% were married couples living together, 11.20% had a female householder with no husband present, and 31.40% were non-families. 27.00% of all households were made up of individuals, and 10.80% had someone living alone who was 65 years of age or older. The average household size was 2.45 and the average family size was 2.97.

In the county, the population was spread out, with 24.70% under the age of 18, 7.20% from 18 to 24, 27.00% from 25 to 44, 25.50% from 45 to 64, and 15.60% who were 65 years of age or older. The median age was 40 years. For every 100 females there were 95.00 males. For every 100 females age 18 and over, there were 92.40 males.

The median income for a household in the county was $42,746, and the median income for a family was $51,756. Males had a median income of $39,249 versus $23,697 for females. The per capita income for the county was $21,530. About 6.00% of families and 8.30% of the population were below the poverty line, including 11.60% of those under age 18 and 6.80% of those age 65 or over.

In 2008, the Census Bureau announced that the county's population had declined to an estimated 77,323 by July 1, 2007.

2010 census
As of the 2010 United States Census, there were 77,079 people, 31,860 households, and 21,011 families residing in the county. The racial makeup of the county was 87.0% white, 8.6% black or African American, 0.6% Asian, 0.3% American Indian, 0.7% from other races, and 2.8% from two or more races. Those of Hispanic or Latino origin made up 3.4% of the population. In terms of ancestry, 38.8% were German, 15.2% were Irish, 11.7% were English, 8.5% were Italian, and 4.6% were American.

Of the 31,860 households, 29.1% had children under the age of 18 living with them, 48.5% were married couples living together, 12.9% had a female householder with no husband present, 34.1% were non-families, and 28.6% of all households were made up of individuals. The average household size was 2.37 and the average family size was 2.89. The median age was 43.4 years.

The median income for a household in the county was $46,593 and the median income for a family was $61,247. Males had a median income of $46,211 versus $32,621 for females. The per capita income for the county was $25,290. About 8.5% of families and 12.5% of the population were below the poverty line, including 17.1% of those under age 18 and 8.5% of those age 65 or over.

Government and politics

Patrick Shenigo (R) is the Chairman of the Erie County Commission, the highest elected position in the county. 

From 1992 to 2012, Erie County had been reliably Democratic. In 2016, however, it swung from a 12.3% margin for Barack Obama to a 9.5% margin for Donald Trump, tracking with Trump's unexpectedly strong showing in the Rust Belt.

|}

County officials

Courthouse

Erie County's courthouse at 323 Columbus Avenue in Sandusky was built in 1872 by Cleveland architects Myer and Holmes in a richly ornamented Second Empire style. Most of the façade was remodeled beginning in 1936 in Art Deco in a WPA project led locally by architect Henry Millott. Some of the original façade remains visible around the bottom row of windows.

Education
All or part of eleven school districts serve Erie County and its residents:
 Bellevue City School District: includes parts of Bellevue and Groton Township.
 Edison Local School District: includes parts of Berlin Heights and Milan, and Berlin, Florence, Huron, Milan, Oxford, Perkins, and Vermilion Townships.
 Firelands Local School District: includes parts of Florence Township.
 Huron City School District: includes parts of Huron and Berlin, Huron, and Milan Townships.
 Kelleys Island Local School District: includes all of Kelleys Island.
 Margaretta Local School District: includes parts of Bay View and Castalia, and Groton and Margaretta Townships.
 Monroeville Local School District: includes parts of Oxford Township.
 Perkins Local School District: includes parts of Groton, Huron, Margaretta, Milan, Oxford, and Perkins Townships.
 Sandusky Central Catholic Schools: includes Sandusky's three catholic Parishes (St. Mary's, Sts. Peter & Paul, and Holy Angels).
 St. Peter's School: a private catholic elementary school in Huron
 Sandusky City School District: includes all of Sandusky.
 Vermilion Local School District: includes parts of Vermilion and Florence and Vermilion Townships.
 Western Reserve Local School District: including parts of Florence Township.

Communities

Cities
 Bellevue (part)
 Huron
 Sandusky (county seat)
 Vermilion (part)

Villages
 Bay View
 Berlin Heights
 Castalia
 Kelleys Island
 Milan (part)

Townships

 Berlin
 Florence
 Groton
 Huron
 Margaretta
 Milan
 Oxford
 Perkins
 Vermilion

https://web.archive.org/web/20160715023447/http://www.ohiotownships.org/township-websites

Census-designated places
 Beulah Beach
 Crystal Rock
 Mitiwanga
 Whites Landing

Unincorporated communities
 Avery
 Axtel
 Birmingham
 Bloomingville
 Bogart
 Ceylon
 Fairview Lanes
 Florence
 Ruggles Beach
 Sandusky South

Places of interest
 Blue Hole
 Cedar Point
 Plum Brook Station
 Thomas Alva Edison Birthplace

See also
 National Register of Historic Places listings in Erie County, Ohio

References

Further reading
 William W. Williams, History of the Fire Lands, Comprising Huron and Erie Counties, Ohio: With Illustrations and Biographical Sketches of Some of the Prominent Men and Pioneers. Cleveland, OH: Press of Leader Printing Company, 1879.

External links
 Erie County Government's website 

 
1838 establishments in Ohio
Populated places established in 1838
Ohio counties in the Western Reserve